Johnny Dorelli (real name Giorgio Guidi; born 20 February 1937) is an Italian actor, singer and television host.

Early life 
Dorelli was born in Meda, Italy. In 1946 he moved to New York City with his family, where his father, Nino D'Aurelio (born Aurelio Guidi), found work as opera singer. Dorelli studied double bass and piano at the High School of Music and Art in New York. He took the stage name Dorelli in imitation of how the surname D'Aurelio was pronounced in English.

His show business career began when he was discovered by bandleader Percy Faith, who brought him on The Ken Murray Show. He later appears on the show By Popular Demand conducted by Robert Alda, accompanied by Paul Whiteman. He receive a great success, in fact some American newspapers described Dorelli as a "phenomenal Italian boy". However he returned to Italy in 1955 due to the expiry of his residence permit.

He debuted as singer and pianist in the late 1950s for CGD label with cover of American standards; Lover, What is this thing called love, Love me or leave me and many others.

Career 
His first success was an easy listening Latin song, Calypso melody in 1957. In 1958 and in 1959 he won the Sanremo Festival in duo with Domenico Modugno, with the songs "Nel blu dipinto di blu" (also known as "Volare") and "Piove (Ciao ciao bambina)".
His most famous songs of the period are : Julia (1958), Boccuccia Di Rosa (Pink Lips) (1958), Love in Portofino (1959), Lettera A Pinocchio (1959), Monte Carlo (1961).

In 1962 he appeared on The Ed Sullivan Show and sang his smooth ballad Love In Portofino and You're the Top with Connie Francis and Johnny Hallyday.

As a (popular and jazz) crooner, he sang numerous songs live on television shows (mainly in the 60's), in Italian and in English.

In 1967 "L'immensità" earned Dorelli a ninth place at the 1967 edition of the Sanremo Song Festival. 
In the same year he was the lead actor on the movie How to Kill 400 Duponts, a parody of the comic series Diabolik. With this role, Dorelli had a great success and he inspired the character of Paperinik. 
Some songs of this periods are Speedy Gonzales (1962), Era Settembre (1964), Probabilmente (1965), Al Buio Sto Sognando (1966), Solo Più Che Mai (Strangers In The Night) (1966), Arriva La Bomba (1967), I Think of You (1972).

His greatest success was the musical Aggiungi un posto a tavola, which was also performed at the Adelphi Theatre in London's West End in an English version entitled Beyond the Rainbow in 1978.

After a period of absence, he returned to success in the 1980s. In 1983, he played St. Philip Neri in Luigi Magni's TV film State buoni se potete. 
Dorelli's latest feature film role is in Pupi Avati's Ma quando arrivano le ragazze (2004).

In 2007 he returned after 38 years to the stage of Sanremo as a participant with the song Meglio così, written by big names as Gianni Ferrio and Giorgio Calabrese, and accompanied by jazz pianist Stefano Bollani and the orchestra conducted by Ferrio.

Personal life 

Dorelli had a long relationship with actress Lauretta Masiero, which produced  a son, Gianluca Guidi. He then married actress  Catherine Spaak (1972–1978), which produced another son, Gabriele, and in 1981 Gloria Guida, a former model and actress in Italian comedy movies of the 1970s, which produced a daughter, Guendalina.

He has two eyes of different colors; condition called heterochromia iridum.

Selected filmography

 Toto, Peppino and the Fanatics, directed by Mario Mattoli (1958)
 How to Kill 400 Duponts, directed by Steno (1967)
 Bread and Chocolate, directed by Franco Brusati (1973)
 Tell Me You Do Everything for Me (1976)
 Il mostro, directed by Luigi Zampa (1977)
 Odd Squad (film), directed by Enzo Barboni (1981)
 State buoni se potete, directed by Luigi Magni (1983)
 But When Do the Girls Get Here?, directed by Pupi Avati (2005)

Discography

Albums

 1955 - Songo americano (CGD, MV 203)
 1958 - Cordialmente (CGD, MV 224)
 1958 - È arrivato da Sanremo (CGD, MV 225)
 1958 - Dance with (Liberty, I 8508)
 1959 - We Like Johnny (CGD, FG 5002)
 1959 - Sanremo 1959 (CGD, SR 1012)
 1964 - 30 anni di canzoni d'amore (CGD, FG 5010)
 1965 - Viaggio Sentimentale (CGD, FG 5017)
 1965 - Johnny Dorelli (CGD, FG 5024)
 1967 - L'immensità (CGD, FG 5032)
 1970 - Promesse Promesse (CGD, FGS 5063, con Catherine Spaak)
 1973 - Le canzoni che piacciono a lei (CGD, 69030)
 1975 - Aggiungi un posto a tavola (CGD, 88119)
 1975 - Toi et Moi (CGD, 69060, con Catherine Spaak)
 1978 - Giorgio (WEA Italiana, T56588)
 1980 - Accendiamo la lampada (Cam, ARSAG 29103)
 1989 - Mi son svegliato e c'eri tu (Five Record, FM 14204)
 2004 - Swingin' (Carosello, CARSM120-2)
 2007 - Swingin' - parte seconda (Carosello, CARSM198)

References

1937 births
Living people
People from Meda
Italian male film actors
Italian male musical theatre actors
Italian male singers
Italian male television actors
Sanremo Music Festival winners
Jamie Records artists
The High School of Music & Art alumni